Neoplatypedia is a genus of cicadas in the family Cicadidae. There are at least two described species in Neoplatypedia.

Species
 Neoplatypedia ampliata (Van Duzee, 1915)
 Neoplatypedia constricta Davis, 1920

References

Further reading

External links

 

Platypediini
Cicadidae genera